Lowell is an unincorporated community in Kearney County, Nebraska, United States.

History
A post office was established at Lowell in the 1870s. Lowell was named for James Russell Lowell, an American poet.

References

Unincorporated communities in Kearney County, Nebraska
Unincorporated communities in Nebraska